Johnathon Ford (born 17 August 1989) is a Cook Islands international rugby league footballer who plays as a  or  for Featherstone Rovers in the Betfred Championship.

He previously played for the Sydney Roosters in the National Rugby League and for Toulouse Olympique.

Background
Ford was born in Toronto, New South Wales, Australia. He is of Cook Island and Irish descent. He is a cousin of former Hull Kingston Rovers player Byron Ford.

Ford played his junior football for the Macquarie Scorpions before being signed by the Newcastle Knights.

Playing career
Ford played for the Knights' NYC team in 2008 and 2009, scoring eight tries and kicking one goal in 30 games. In 2010, Ford signed with the Sydney Roosters. In Round 23 of the 2010 NRL season he made his NRL debut for the Roosters against the Cronulla-Sutherland Sharks. In 2012, Ford signed with Toulouse Olympique in the Elite One Championship. Ford continued playing for the Cook Islands team in the 2013 Rugby League World Cup.
In 2014, Ford joined the Wyong Roos in the New South Wales Cup.
In 2015, Ford continued to play with the Wyong Roos in the New South Wales Cup, helping them to the New South Wales Cup Grand final.

Toulouse Olympique

2011-2012
On 26 September 2011, Toulouse announced that they had signed the 22 year old Ford from Sydney Roosters in the NRL. He played three times for the Roosters in the NRL in 2011. Ford's debut for Toulouse was delayed by a week, due to international duty with the Cook Islands. He made his debut for TO on 22 October 2011 in the second game of the French Elite 1 2011/12 season, a 22–14 victory at Stade Arnauné against Pia. This was Toulouse's first season back in the French competition, having played the previous three seasons in the British Championship. Ford played in all of the remaining 18 league and play-off matches for Toulouse that season, scoring four tries.

2018
In October 2018, he signed a contract extension for the 2019 season. It was reported that several Super League sides, including Castleford Tigers were interested in Ford.

2020
In July 2020, Ford extended his contract for a further two years until the end of the 2022 season.

2021
In March, Toulouse announced that Ford would step up from vice-captain to replace Con Mika, who had moved to Villeneuve as captain for the 2021 season. On 10 October 2021, Ford captained Toulouse in their victory over Featherstone in the Million Pound Game which saw him lift the Championship trophy as the club earned promotion to the Super League for the first time in their history.

2022
On 26 January, Toulouse announced that Ford had left the club by mutual agreement due to "family and personal reasons". Ford's departure came 17 days before Toulouse's first ever game in Super League.

Featherstone Rovers
On 17 April 2022, it was announced that Ford had joined Featherstone Rovers.

International career
In 2009, Ford played three games for the Cook Islands in the 2009 Pacific Cup. On 17 October 2015, Ford captained the Cook Islands in their Asia-Pacific Qualifier match against Tonga for the 2017 Rugby League World Cup. Ford was selected in the 24 man Cook Islands team for the 2021 Rugby League World Cup. In the opening round of the 2021 Rugby League World Cup, Ford earned man of the match honours in the Cook Islands 18-12 victory over minnows Wales.

References

External links

Toulouse Olympique profile

2010 Newtown Jets profile
Yahoo.com profile

1989 births
Living people
Australian expatriate rugby league players
Australian expatriate sportspeople in England
Australian expatriate sportspeople in France
Australian people of Cook Island descent
Australian people of Irish descent
Australian rugby league players
Cook Islands national rugby league team captains
Cook Islands national rugby league team players
Expatriate rugby league players in France
Featherstone Rovers players
Macquarie Scorpions players
Newtown Jets NSW Cup players
Rugby league centres
Rugby league five-eighths
Rugby league fullbacks
Rugby league halfbacks
Rugby league players from Newcastle, New South Wales
Sydney Roosters players
Toulouse Olympique players
Wyong Roos players